The 1991 German Grand Prix was a Formula One motor race held at the Hockenheimring on 28 July 1991. It was the ninth race of the 1991 Formula One World Championship, and the first German Grand Prix to be held in Germany after the reunification between West and East Germany.

The 45-lap race was won from pole position by British driver Nigel Mansell, driving a Williams-Renault. It was Mansell's third consecutive Grand Prix victory. His Italian teammate Riccardo Patrese finished second, with Frenchman Jean Alesi third in a Ferrari.

Drivers' Championship leader, Brazilian Ayrton Senna, failed to score in his McLaren-Honda after running out of fuel for the second consecutive race, allowing Mansell to close to within eight points of him.

Pre-race
Ayrton Senna spent a night in a hospital in Mannheim after crashing during pre-race testing a week earlier. Senna suffered a tyre failure at the end of a long straight, causing the car to launch into the air and turn over several times. The McLaren-Honda went 15 feet into the air and was destroyed in the crash, according to witnesses. After regaining consciousness, Senna was taken to hospital with neck and chest bruising.

There were two changes to the entry list, the first was at Lotus where Johnny Herbert was replaced by young German Michael Bartels because of the former's Japanese Formula 3000 commitments, and the second was at Footwork where Alex Caffi was back in action after his road accident. Elsewhere Satoru Nakajima announced he would retire at the end of the year.

Qualifying

Pre-qualifying report
The participants in the Friday morning pre-qualifying sessions were reshuffled prior to this event, the season having reached its mid-point. Scuderia Italia (Dallara) and Jordan had scored points, and were thus relieved of the requirement to pre-qualify, and could automatically join the rest of the field in the main qualifying sessions from here on. By virtue of Nicola Larini's seventh place finish at the first round in Phoenix, the Modena team were also lifted out of pre-qualifying, despite struggling in the sessions at recent Grands Prix.

Taking their places during the Friday morning sessions were Brabham, AGS, and Footwork, who had all failed to score points so far in 1991, or match Modena Lambo's seventh place finish at any race. Fondmetal and Coloni were also still required to pre-qualify.

Here at Hockenheim, the fastest pre-qualifier was Martin Brundle in the Brabham BT60Y. He was over a second faster than the AGS JH25B of Gabriele Tarquini, with Michele Alboreto just a tenth behind in the Footwork FA12C, despite gearbox problems. The fourth pre-qualifier was the other Brabham of Mark Blundell.

The four entrants missing out included Fondmetal driver Olivier Grouillard, who suffered an engine failure and finished fifth fastest, ahead of the second Footwork of Alex Caffi, who had returned to the cockpit after missing four races. The second AGS of Italian Fabrizio Barbazza was seventh, nearly a second ahead of regular backmarker Pedro Chaves for the cash-strapped Coloni team.

Pre-qualifying classification

Qualifying report
In Saturday practice Érik Comas had a massive accident at the Ostkurve chicane in his Ligier. The French driver was unhurt, but it raised questions about the safety of the second chicane. In qualifying, Nigel Mansell took pole from title rival Ayrton Senna. Gerhard Berger was third, followed by Riccardo Patrese- the Williams and McLaren cars were within 4 tenths of each other but were all nearly 2 seconds faster of the next fastest cars, the 2 Ferraris of Alain Prost and Jean Alesi, which were a second quicker than the next fastest car behind them. Then following the Ferraris were Andrea de Cesaris, Nelson Piquet, Roberto Moreno, and Pierluigi Martini in the Minardi, taking full advantage of his Ferrari engine around the high speed circuit.

Qualifying classification

Race

Race report
On Sunday, a couple of hours before the race, there was a FIA driver's meeting and Senna requested to race director Roland Bruynseraede that the tyre walls at the chicanes be replaced with traffic cones because of the possibility of hitting the tyres and rolling; that happened to him during qualifying for the Mexican Grand Prix, and this heated up when FIA president Jean-Marie Balestre, Senna and a few other drivers had a brief argument over the regulations involving safety. Balestre then instigated a democratic vote, and the vote went towards removing the tyre walls and replacing them with traffic cones.

At the start of the race, Mansell made a great start while Berger slotted into second ahead of team-mate Senna, with Prost, Patrese, and Alesi rounding out the top six. At the back Mark Blundell spun but continued, although Larini spun off into retirement in his attempt to avoid the Brabham. Berger made a bad pit-stop and fell back to tenth, while Prost started to reel in Senna. Mansell was running away at the front and when he pitted for tyres he dropped just behind Alesi, but did not waste time in changing the situation and passed Alesi two laps later to re-take the lead. While Mansell was surging away, a tremendous battle developed for third place between Senna, Prost, and Patrese, with Riccardo beating both men before setting off after Alesi. Senna and Prost continued to squabble over fourth and the major talking point came on lap 37 when Prost attempted to pass Senna going into the first chicane. Prost was faster and tried to go around the outside, Senna would not give way and Prost went off and proceeded to stall the engine. Prost blamed Senna and said he would not be so forgiving the next time while Senna accused Prost of complaining for the sake of complaining.  Prost's comments would earn him a one-race suspended ban, while the FIA ordered a sit-down meeting between the two men at the next race. Meanwhile, Mansell cruised to his third straight win, leading home Patrese, Alesi, Berger, de Cesaris, and Gachot, Senna having run out of fuel on the last lap for the second straight race and being classified seventh, allowing Mansell to close to within eight points of Senna in the drivers championship.

Race classification

Championship standings after the race

Drivers' Championship standings

Constructors' Championship standings

References

German Grand Prix
German Grand Prix
Grand Prix
German Grand Prix